Qaleh-ye Bertianchi (also Romanized as Qal‘eh-ye Bertīānchī) is a village in Jey Rural District, in the Central District of Isfahan County, Isfahan Province, Iran. At the 2006 census, its population was 1,023, in 269 families.

References 

Populated places in Isfahan County